Dappula de Livera  is a Sri Lankan lawyer and the former Attorney General of Sri Lanka. He previously served as the Solicitor General of Sri Lanka from February 2018 and took over as acting attorney general from 29April 2019 until his formal appointment in May 2019.

Career 
Educated at St. Joseph's College and St. Anthony's College, Kandy, he studied law at Sri Lanka Law College, taking oaths as an Attorney-at-Law of the Supreme Court of Sri Lanka in 1984.

He joined the Attorney General's Department in 1985 as a State Counsel. He went on to hold the posts of Senior State Counsel, Deputy Solicitor General, Additional Solicitor General, Senior Additional Solicitor General. He had functioned as a Senior Prosecutor and Appellate Counsel for the Republic, Head of the Criminal Division of Attorney General's Department. He had also on secondment served as a State Counsel for the Attorney General's Department of the Republic of Seychelles.

In 2002, he gained an LLM from the University College London and holds a Diploma in International Relations from the Bandaranaike Centre for International Studies. He was appointed as a President's Counsel in 2014.

During his tenure at the Attorney General's Department he had served as a member of the National Commission against the Proliferation of Small Arms and Light Weapons; and the Task Force established by the Ministry of Justice to deal with human smuggling and illegal migration; legal consultant and member of the advisory board of the Financial Intelligence Unit of the Central Bank of Sri Lanka. He had worked as the senior legal counsel to the special presidential commission appointed to inquire into issues relating to the maintenance of law and order and was the chief prosecutor commission of inquiry on bond issuance.

On 18February 2018, he was appointed Solicitor General and served till 29 April before Dilrukshi Dias Wickramasinghe took over from him. After holding the Solicitor General position, he was appointed as the acting Attorney General after Jayantha Jayasuriya was appointed as Chief Justice of Sri Lanka. His appointment was confirmed on 7May by the Constitutional Council and was sworn in on 10May 2019. He retired from the position of Attorney General in May 2021 and was replaced by Sanjay Rajaratnam in the relevant position.

He is married to activist Marini De Livera.

References

W
Year of birth missing (living people)
President's Counsels (Sri Lanka)
20th-century Sri Lankan lawyers
Sinhalese lawyers
Living people
21st-century Sri Lankan lawyers